The Stranger is a 2014 Chilean horror-thriller film directed by Guillermo Amoedo and starring Cristobal Tapia Montt, Ariel Levy, Lorenza Izzo and Nicolás Durán. It is the third film from Sobras International Pictures project Chilewood.  Montt plays a drifter who enters a small town, seeking information about his estranged wife.

Plot
Martin, a drifter, arrives in a small town and asks about a woman named Ana.  Peter, a teenager, directs him to a cemetery.  As Martin mourns her death and recalls his past with her, three thugs harass him.  When their leader, Caleb, threatens to kill Martin, Martin dares them to do so.  Peter interrupts them as they savagely beat Martin, then flees when Caleb stabs Martin.  Having been flagged down by Peter, Lieutenant De Luca arrives and confronts Caleb, who claims self-defense.  De Luca, revealed to be Caleb's father, calls him a liar and orders him to help cover up the crime; neither realize that Peter is watching.  They leave Martin for dead in a ditch after De Luca is called away, and Peter brings him home when he notices life signs.

Peter's mother, Monica, does not want to get involved, but Peter convinces her to perform first aid, which Martin refuses, saying that his blood is contagious.  After questioning them further about what happened to Ana and learning she committed suicide after giving birth, Martin disappears.  When De Luca returns to bury the body and finds it missing, he immediately suspects Peter.  He sends Caleb to take care of the situation.  Peter promises not to tell anyone, but Caleb beats him when he insists he does not know Martin's whereabouts.  Before they can kill Peter, Martin kills Caleb's friends and sets Caleb on fire.  De Luca interrogates Peter, who admits he moved Martin's body, but De Luca initially does not believe Martin could have survive his injuries.  Nonetheless, he identifies Martin as his son's attacker, and the police begin a manhunt.

After becoming drunk, De Luca encounters Peter again and takes him a to secluded spot.  There, De Luca continues the interrogation and sets Peter on fire when he continues to insist he knows nothing about Martin.  After knocking De Luca unconscious, Martin rescues Peter and takes him back to Monica's house.  As she calls an ambulance, Martin recites a Latin blessing and rubs his blood on Peter.  Later, at the hospital, Peter miraculously recovers and is discharged.  As Monica and Peter flee the town, the police capture Martin.  De Luca stops the bus Peter and Monica have boarded, abducts them, and forces them to reveal how Peter was healed.  He makes Monica, a nurse, perform a transfusion from Martin to Caleb.  Martin begs her not to do so and insists that his blood must be blessed to prevent infection, but De Luca ignores him.

Though healed by Martin's blood, Caleb becomes infected.  He kills and drains Monica of blood, then leaves the hospital with his father.  The police go to De Luca's house to question him.  When he refuses to come out, they assault the house.  Peter goes to the jail to free Martin but finds Martin is powerless to revive the dead, though Martin demands they stop Caleb.  When Martin arrives at De Luca's house, he finds De Luca and Caleb missing, and all the cops but the chief of police are dead.  Martin kills the wounded chief of police, explaining that he has become infected.  As they race after Caleb, De Luca rams their car.  In the resulting accident, Peter becomes wounded and accidentally infects himself when he comes into contact with Martin's blood. Martin ties him to a tree and leaves. De Luca is killed in the encounter.

A passing motorist with a pet dog frees Peter.  Martin finds and confronts Caleb, but he is overpowered by Caleb, who has killed and fed off a young girl.  Peter arrives, his face bloody and dirty from feeding, and drags Caleb into the sunlight, protected by heavy clothing; Caleb disintegrates.  Martin reveals that he and Ana are Peter's true parents; Monica adopted him after Ana's suicide.  Martin tells Peter to be stronger than his mother and requests that Peter leave him to die in the Sun.  As Peter leaves, it is revealed that he fed off of the motorist's pet dog, who he lets out of her car.  He then drives away.

Cast

 Cristobal Tapia Montt as Martin
 Nicolás Durán as Peter
 Lorenza Izzo as Ana
 Luis Gnecco as Lieutenant De Luca
 Ariel Levy as Caleb
 Alessandra Guerzoni as Monica
 Aaron Burns as Officer Harris
 John Allan as Police Chief
 Eric Kleinsteuber as Caleb's Friend
 Sally Rose as Nurse Sonia
 Pablo Vila as Doctor Hill
 Manuel Márquez as Jack

Production
Filming took place in Chile and included financing from the Chilean government.

Release
In September 2014, The Stranger was premiered at the 2014 Fantastic Fest Film Festival. In January 2015 IFC Midnight acquired the distribution rights for the United States.

Reception
The Stranger won the "Best Iberoamerican Film" Award on Sitges Film Festival.  Rotten Tomatoes, a review aggregator, reports that 27% of 11 surveyed critics gave the film a positive review; the average is 4/10.  Metacritic rated it 32/100 based on six reviews.  Frank Scheck of The Hollywood Reporter called it a "lifeless, fang-less vampire movie" that avoids traditional cliches but descends into uninteresting melodrama.  Maitland McDonagh of Film Journal International wrote that it will appeal to neither Twilight fans nor hardcore horror fans, but it is "admirably eerie and remarkably restrained".  Andy Webster of The New York Times questioned whether the film's unoriginal violence has a moral but praised the film's acting and direction.  Robert Abele of the Los Angeles Times wrote that it "comes across like an amateur play at gravitas, one unsupported by dully weighted scenes and clunky dialogue".  Patrick Cooper of Bloody Disgusting rated it 1/5 stars and called it an "utterly forgettable" film that fails to grab audiences.  Drew Tinnin of Dread Central rated it 2.5/5 stars and wrote that the film "is filled with so much desperation that it can't help but be depressing even with some uplifting themes about sacrifice and family bonds".

See also 
 Cinema of Chile

References

External links
 

2014 films
2014 horror films
2014 horror thriller films
Chilean horror thriller films
2010s English-language films
English-language Chilean films
Films produced by Eli Roth
2010s Chilean films